Leroy Jethro Gibbs (born November 21, 1954) is a fictional character and the original protagonist of the CBS TV series NCIS, portrayed by Mark Harmon. He is a former U.S. Marine Corps Scout Sniper turned special agent who commands a team for the Naval Criminal Investigative Service. Gibbs is the most accomplished marksman on the team and the most skilled at handling violent standoffs; he depends on his other agents heavily for technical forensics and background checks. He is patient but firm with his team and has little patience for bureaucracy; he commands most other main characters—including his current staff Timothy McGee and Nick Torres and previous staff Caitlin Todd (killed in the line of duty), Anthony DiNozzo (left to look after his newly found daughter), Ziva David (presumed as killed after leaving NCIS; later revealed to have gone into hiding), Alexandra Quinn (left to look after her sick mother), Clayton Reeves (killed while defending Abby Sciuto), Ellie Bishop (left presumably for a mission with Odette) and Jacqueline Sloane (left to pursue humanitarian work in Afghanistan).

Having found peace in Alaska for the first time since his family's death, Gibbs leaves NCIS in the episode "Great Wide Open" in search of adventure.

Development and casting
Series creator Donald P. Bellisario initially did not think Mark Harmon would fit the role of Gibbs, a "flinty type with a strong sense of honor and respect for the military", but changed his mind after viewing a tape of Harmon's portrayal of a Secret Service agent on The West Wing. Co-executive producer Charles Floyd Johnson recalls, "We all looked at that work. And everybody said, 'He's Gibbs.' Harmon was cast in 2003, and Bellisario explained, "I said, 'Oh, my God, he's Gibbs.' He had matured. He's good-looking in a totally different way than he was as a young guy." At another point, he said, "I am so lucky to have Mark Harmon as the lead. You have no idea. This cast is gold. Mark Harmon is a Middle American guy, even if he was raised in Southern California. His values are exactly the same as mine."

Harmon said of his character, "I was attracted by [his] flaws. He has lousy taste in women. He's addicted to coffee."

Gibbs was initially written as "not too far removed" from characters like Dr. Robert "Bobby" Caldwell and Dr. Jack McNeil, both previous roles by Harmon. In an early episode, Gibbs "playfully smacked Weatherly's DiNozzo on the back of the head" resulting in the trademark "headslap" that later appeared in many episodes throughout the seasons.

In later years, he is scripted as more stoic, with Bellisario stating, "I thought the best thing to do was to give him a minimum of dialogue." It was not until the third season that the backstory surrounding his first wife and daughter's murder was revealed. His relationships with his coworkers were developed, with him becoming something of a father figure to Special Agent Ziva David and Forensic Specialist Abby Sciuto.

Mark Harmon's oldest son Sean has appeared on NCIS portraying a younger version of Gibbs in flashbacks.

Background
In the backstory, Gibbs was born on November 21, 1954, and was shown in the episode "Heartland" to have grown up in Stillwater, Pennsylvania. The town is real, and the scenes in the episode were modeled after Bellisario's hometown of Cokeburg. His father, Jackson Gibbs (played by Ralph Waite), owned and ran the Stillwater General Store. He is named after his father's close friend and partner in the store, Leroy Jethro "LJ" Moore, after they worked together in the coal mines (Winslow Mining Company). In "The Namesake", it is revealed that LJ, a World War II veteran and Montford Point Marine, had influenced the teenaged Gibbs to join the Marines. Gibbs left Stillwater in 1976 to join the Marine Corps and had little contact with the place for the next thirty years. In a flashback scene in the episode, as a teenager, Gibbs often provoked violence with defiance to his father, who constantly comes to his unwanted aid with a Winchester rifle. He was also known around the area as a delinquent, as said by the new sheriff, one of the other delinquents during his teenage years, stating, "Funny, never expected to find you on the same side of the law." He met his first wife Shannon (portrayed by both Darby Stanchfield and Aviva Baumann) in Stillwater, who worked at the local women’s clothing store, Ellen’s Dress Shop, speaking to each other for the first time while both waiting for a train. Gibbs was leaving for Marine Combat Training having just graduated from bootcamp. At that first meeting, Shannon mentioned she had thought about creating a set of life rules for herself; Gibbs later incorporated this idea into his own series of around fifty rules that he now lives by (with the rules in the forties and above supposedly used for emergency situations). Gibbs is known by his first name, Leroy, to family and people in his hometown (as well as his ex-wife Diane), whereas at work he is known as Gibbs, Jethro, or simply "Boss". Shannon called him both Gibbs and Jethro.

Gibbs' mother, Ann, is introduced in "Life Before His Eyes", the 200th episode. She was a redhead, like all of Gibbs' wives. While she was dying of cancer, she took her own life by overdose so her family would not have to watch her suffer ("The Namesake").

Gibbs enlisted in the Marine Corps in 1976 and was a military police non-commissioned officer at Camp Lejeune before becoming a Scout Sniper.  After graduating from bootcamp, Gibbs shipped out to Camp LeJeune for further training. There he befriended fellow Marine Private First Class Joan Matteson, but she was one of several marines killed in a helicopter crash on 03 April 1977 after she was deployed to Okinawa, Japan.

He served on tours of duty in Panama (Operation Just Cause) and with the 1st Battalion 1st Marines in the Persian Gulf (Operation Desert Storm). In the season 6 episode "Deliverance", it is revealed that he was also deployed to Colombia on a classified mission. Not long after returning from the Gulf, he retired from the Marine Corps with the rank of Gunnery Sergeant and joined the Naval Investigative Service (as the Naval Criminal Investigative Service was then called) in August 1992. 

As a junior agent, Gibbs was mentored by Mike Franks, and the two became close friends; Franks continued calling him "Probie" even after retirement. After Franks retired, Gibbs rose to become head of his own Major Case Response Team. Before the time in which NCIS is set, Gibbs was described to have traveled extensively on operations, particularly in Eastern Europe.

Gibbs is a highly skilled marksman with both his agency-issued SIG Sauer P228 pistol (which he replaces with a .45 Colt M1911A1 pistol in Season 15) and a sniper rifle.  In the season 7 premiere, "Truth or Consequences", he kills the terrorists holding his team hostage from an exceptionally long distance and in "South by Southwest" he outshoots a professional hit-man in an approaching helicopter. His knowledge of the Marine Corps and training as a sniper often comes into use, as shown in the episodes "Ravenous", "Vanished" and "Twenty Klicks" where he uses his wilderness tracking skills and marksmanship to aid the investigation and/or get the team out of trouble.

Gibbs is a private man of few words who discloses little to nothing about his personal life. He avoids discussing his life or past before he joined NCIS, especially to agents and co-workers under him, which leads to his team members constantly speculating over his private life. Aside from his tendency to use military slang, he rarely mentions or speaks at length about his time in the Marine Corps although he is often referred to as "Gunny" by other Navy and Marine officers, occasionally dons a "USMC" hoodie or T-shirt when off duty and has a replica of the iconic Raising the Flag on Iwo Jima photograph framed and mounted above the fireplace in his home.

Gibbs holds service personnel in the armed forces in high esteem and to a higher standard. He becomes particularly indignant when the guilty party is someone in a position of trust and authority, and he has reacted violently on several occasions when apprehending corrupt high-ranking officers who committed crimes for monetary gain.

Relationships

Family

In the season 6 episode "Heartland", Gibbs' frosty relationship with his father Jackson and the backstory behind it is revealed. His father had rarely been mentioned up to that point and Jackson had not known that Gibbs was a "boss"  until Gibbs and his team visited Stillwater to investigate a case. By the end of the episode, they make amends and the two have become closer ever since.

Through a series of episodes over a few years, it becomes clear that Gibbs killed Pedro Hernandez in revenge for the death of his wife Shannon and his daughter Kelly. In the episode "Borderland" (Season 7, episode 22), an unknown conspirator manipulates events so that Abby ends up investigating the murder as a cold case and finds irrefutable proof that Gibbs is responsible. Hernandez' now-grown children Paloma Reynosa, the head of the Reynosa drug cartel after taking her spouse's place when he was killed, and Alejandro Rivera, a high-ranking official of the Mexican Justice Department, appear in the episode "Spider and the Fly".  In this episode, Gibbs manipulates Alejandro Rivera into killing Paloma, and Alejandro is subsequently arrested. Shortly thereafter, Director Vance files Abby's report proving that Gibbs killed Hernandez deep in the NCIS evidence room. When Gibbs comes under investigation in the Season 10 finale "Damned If You Do", Vance retrieves the report and shreds it, deciding to permanently bury all leads to the truth so that Gibbs will not be found and convicted of murder.

Marriages
Gibbs has been married four times, and divorced three (his first wife was killed).
 Shannon Fielding was Gibbs' first wife. In the episode "Heartland", Gibbs is revealed by flashbacks to have met Shannon (portrayed in that episode by Aviva Baumann) while waiting at the Stillwater train platform in summer of 1972, where she tells him about her rules for life that would inspire a similar set of Gibbs' own that he now teaches to his subordinate agents at NCIS. In "Hiatus (Part II)", they were stated to have married in December 1981, and Kelly was born sometime in 1982. He was unable to be at the birth of Kelly as he was deployed. Shannon, along with their eight-year-old daughter Kelly, was murdered by a Mexican drug dealer named Pedro Hernandez on the last official day of Operation Desert Storm. Gibbs was an active member of the Marine Corps at the time and was still overseas when they were killed.  In "Hiatus (Part II)" Director Shepard tells Dr. Donald "Ducky" Mallard that Shannon had witnessed a murder of a Marine at Camp Pendleton, where Gibbs was based at that time. Shannon had identified the murderer as Mexican-born drug dealer Pedro Hernandez. Afterwards, Hernandez shot the NIS agent driving Shannon and Kelly in a minivan and the subsequent crash took their lives. Gibbs retaliated by seeking out Pedro and assassinating him, leaving behind an empty shell casing as a message. Paloma Reynosa later indicated he left a live round.
 This secret remained with him for 20 years until it came to light when Abby discovered the truth through a forensic investigation.
 Diane Sterling (Melinda McGraw) was Gibbs' second wife. After divorcing Gibbs she married FBI Senior Special Agent Tobias Fornell (Joe Spano). However, this marriage was only slightly more positive than her last, and ultimately failed. As she did with Gibbs, Diane drained Fornell's bank account when she left him. Fornell and Diane have a daughter, Emily, who dies of a drug overdose in Season 18.  In the season 9 episode "Devil's Triangle", Gibbs tells Diane that he liked her—he always liked her, and still likes her. Diane tells him their marriage fell apart because she was in love with him, but she could not compete with Shannon. She later asks Gibbs and Fornell to save her third husband Victor. It was later revealed that she invited Gibbs and Fornell to the wedding but they did not attend, although Gibbs did send a wedding present (a waffle iron). During the Season 12 episode "Check", Diane is shown on good terms with his other ex, Rebecca, due to their mutual enjoyment of picking on Gibbs. She is later shot dead by terrorist Sergei Mishnev (Alex Veadov). Gibbs flew into a rage and beat Mishnev but he was able to escape. Gibbs later allows Tobias Fornell (Diane's second ex-husband) to avenge Diane's death.
 Rebecca Chase (Jeri Ryan), Gibbs' third wife, is introduced in season 12. She and Gibbs divorced because Rebecca cheated on Gibbs and it is revealed in that season's episode 11 that she is marrying the man with whom she cheated on Gibbs and it was shown that the latter had no idea of her marriage to Gibbs when they got together. She is shown on good terms with his other ex, Diane, due to their enjoyment of picking on Gibbs. She tries to make amends with Gibbs, who is initially uninterested but they do end up talking.
 Stephanie Flynn (Kathleen York), Gibbs' most recent wife, also a redhead, lived with him during his service in Moscow, Russia, for about a year. According to Gibbs, she was the one who left him. The reason for this was revealed in the Season 3 episode "Mind Games", in which Ducky notes that Gibbs became so obsessed with catching serial killer Kyle Boone that it incited the collapse of their marriage, which happened no later than 1995, the year Gibbs captured Boone. She is also said in the Season 1 episode, "Hung Out to Dry", to get drunk and dial Gibbs incessantly on the day of their former wedding anniversary, which leads him to aggressively disable or even ruin his phones to shut her out.  She is introduced in Season 5 "Ex-Files", when her new boyfriend is accused of murder. As with his other exes, Stephanie is hostile with him and he finds his patience tested when seeing her speak to his current girlfriend. However, at the end, the pair reconcile after she discovers her boyfriend was innocent but cheating on her, and she gives Gibbs back his military dog tags that she held onto. She moves to Philadelphia to care for her aging parents and help her sister with her nieces and nephews.

Other romantic relationships
After Shannon and Kelly's deaths and before he married his second wife, it is suggested that Gibbs had an affair with a woman named Rose Tamayo in Colombia. He was on a classified drug interdiction mission as a Marine Scout Sniper, and was wounded during the mission. In "Deliverance", Rose's now-adult son Tomas is introduced as a person of interest in a case. Gibbs' team suspected that he was the boy's father, but Gibbs later reveals to Tomas that Rose was already pregnant when Gibbs came to their village.  It is later revealed that the drug lord Gibbs was sent to assassinate was the boy's father.

Gibbs also had a past romantic relationship with the (now deceased) director of NCIS, Jenny Shepard, who was also his partner at the time. Jenny was also a redhead. In the first, second, and third seasons, he was seen in the company of a mysterious (and never-identified) redheaded woman. According to Bellisario, the purpose of "the mysterious redhead" was "to make everyone speculate".

In season four, he has a steady, serious relationship with Army CID agent Lt. Col. Hollis Mann (Susanna Thompson), but their relationship is revealed to be over at the beginning of season five.

In season 7, Gibbs meets lawyer Margaret Allison Hart (Rena Sofer), who worked for an old enemy of Gibbs, Col. Merton Bell. Although Gibbs and Hart oppose each other over several cases, they are also attracted to one another. When it was discovered that Bell was responsible for the death of Lara Macy in connection with the long-ago murder of Pedro Hernandez, Hart turned her back on Bell, showing her allegiance to Gibbs.

In season 9, Gibbs begins a romance with Dr. Samantha Ryan (Jamie Lee Curtis), a psychologist with the DOD PsyOps, who has collaborated with his team in several episodes.

The season 16 episode "Hail and Farewell" revealed that Gibbs was also engaged to a fifth woman, Ellen Wallace, who was thought to have died in the September 11 attacks, but was murdered the night before; Gibbs broke off the engagement about two months before her death.

Since her introduction in the series in season 15 episode 4, forensic psychologist Jack Sloane (Maria Bello) has shared a close bond with Gibbs, to the point that the other team members question if Gibbs and Sloane have "a thing". The two share a kiss in Sloane's final episode (season 18 episode 8).

Personality
A decorated Marine, Gibbs is portrayed as a consummate organizer, disciplined and demanding. These traits often put him in a stand-off with other authorities when they exert pressure on his team. He is a no-nonsense agent who displays a continuous urgency about the investigation he pursues, specifically when being given technical information about complex subject matter. The typical response to such information is "Give it to me in English", thus forcing the expert to get to the point, as well as making it easy for the audience to understand. It is a well-known fact with his agents that he dislikes any ambiguous references and terms such as "assuming" and "maybe" when discussing a case or dealing with evidence. He also displays elements of sarcasm, particularly in relation to someone in his company stating something obvious. The typical sarcastic answer "Ya think?" is his preferred retort.
 He is known for communicating displeasure with a single look or the "silent treatment". One of his interrogating techniques is to sit and glare at the suspect for twenty minutes or until the suspect buckles under pressure. Gibbs' "steely gaze can cool a room by five degrees". In direct contrast, when enraged, Gibbs will often slam his hands down on the interrogation room table very violently and rattle a tight-lipped suspect with the sudden outburst.
 He is acknowledged as one of the "best interrogators in law enforcement" and has occasionally been requested by external agencies to conduct interrogations.
 Gibbs has little patience for the "politics" and bureaucracy his job entails, usually leaving that aspect to his director, and prefers to be out in the field working with his agents. In "Trojan Horse", he briefly served as acting director while Jenny Shepard was in Paris attending an Interpol conference and displayed an intense dislike of the paperwork that comes with it.
 One of Gibbs' most noted traits is his gut instinct. Tony explained to Ziva that "the Boss moves in mysterious ways" when she challenged Gibbs' judgment in "Honor Code" (later in the episode Gibbs is proven right).
 He has no patience with high-tech hardware, as seen in the Season 4 episode "Witch Hunt" when he stomps a Roomba to pieces in order to prevent it from vacuuming up evidence at a crime scene. He is also known for destroying many other electronic devices (especially mobile phones), and his adherence to a flip phone long after the rise of the smartphone. It is also heavily implied that he obstructed the main office's technological upgrades, such as the switch to digital monitors and instant video chat capabilities beyond the communications center, which deeply upset MIT graduate McGee.
 On rare occasions, if the usual judicial process is incapable of bringing a suspect to justice, he will turn a blind eye and allow "street justice" to run its course. One example occurs in the Season 3 episode "Iced", when a street gang member suspected of killing three of his subordinates must be released for lack of evidence. Gibbs drops him off on a street corner where he runs into several angry gang members, who have learned of the circumstances through a visit to the NCIS morgue; the team later sees a TV news report that the suspect has been shot dead.

 His hobby is woodworking. Gibbs is shown to have a wooden-hulled sailboat under construction in his basement, which he builds entirely by hand without power tools. In the episode "Tribes", he tells FBI Agent Langer: "Finished it twice. This is number three." He later tells NCIS Director Jenny Shepard that he is working on his fourth boat, and that he named one of the previous boats after his (then current) wife when he finished it, then burned it after their divorce. Team members and acquaintances often question (with no explanation) as to how the completed boats are removed from the basement. Gibbs has also been shown making wooden toys with his father around Christmas time, repairing doors and furniture, fixing the roof on Mike Franks' beach house, and offering to build Franks a teak hot tub. In "Pyramid", it is revealed that Gibbs built Mike Franks' coffin.
 Gibbs has a habit of slapping the members of his team in the back of the head when displeased with their performance or, if they get sidetracked on another topic, to get them focused back on the case. DiNozzo is usually the recipient, due to his outlandish behavior and offensive remarks. His team members occasionally slap one another in this way, but none of them apply it to Gibbs for fear of retribution. "Hiatus" (season 4) reveals that Gibbs acquired the habit from Mike Franks, who occasionally did it to Gibbs when he was in charge of the team. The only people Gibbs does not slap in his work circle are his superiors, including NCIS Directors Jenny Shepard and Leon Vance; Abby Sciuto, whom he regards like a daughter; and Dr. Donald Mallard, a longtime respected friend. On one occasion (Season 3's "Family Secrets"), Gibbs slaps himself for covering up evidence of an organ transplant.
 Another of Gibbs' quirks is his tendency to stop the building's elevator between floors if he needs to have a short, urgent, private conversation with someone. He does this most often with his agents, and occasionally with his superiors or other law enforcement personnel. He also used it in several episodes for conversations with FBI agent Tobias Fornell, who joked that it was their favorite conference room. In the Season 13 two-part story "Sister City", Gibbs and Dwayne Cassius Pride (an NCIS agent stationed in New Orleans) have a disagreement over which of them stole this idea from the other.
 In the episode "Faking It", it is revealed that Gibbs speaks fluent Russian, and he at least speaks a little Japanese and Chinese ("Call of Silence" and "My Other Left Foot", respectively). He also signs American Sign Language, which appears in many episodes in conversations with forensic scientist Abby Sciuto, whose parents are deaf.
 Gibbs follows (and occasionally breaks or revises) a long series of rules, which he appears to have memorized, that apply to life situations and casework, and are a frequent episode plot device. These include "never go anywhere without a knife". His team is known to quote them by heart after learning them via osmosis from working around him.  There was no evidence that the rules existed in writing prior to Season 7 (Episode 24 "Rule 51"), when Gibbs opened a small metal box and added rule 51 by writing it on the back of the slip for rule 13. Most of the rules are recited in Season 12 Episode 10 "House Rules" while Tim McGee writes a farewell letter to his late father. In Season 16 ("She"), Gibbs burnt the slip with "10: Never get personally involved in a case." Later that season ("Perennial"), he says that once he has gotten rid of a rule, the rule is gone for good. In the season 18 finale "Rule 91," he adds the titular rule to his series, stating, "When you decide to walk away, don't look back", though McGee countered in the Season 19 premiere that this was in violation of Rule 1, "never screw over a partner."
 Gibbs wants useful information as fast as possible and under the assumption his team has already done all the necessary legwork in advance; when this is not so, they lose face with him very quickly. Gibbs is also remarkably hostile towards idle chatter without a purpose, and things that go over his head like technobabble and medical jargon, wanting conversations to be curt and decisive. Additionally, Gibbs prefers to avoid deep conversations and will tell people if they are making him uncomfortable.
 He has a constant habit of sneaking up on his team members from behind and dropping in on their conversations unannounced, generally as he tells them to grab their gear before heading out to investigate a crime. It is later revealed in Season 13 that the skylight above the main office of the NCIS building reverberates when people speak and Gibbs is able to hear echoes of what they say coming into the room and eavesdrop.
 Gibbs is a habitual coffee drinker. When his coffee is spilled or someone else takes and/or drinks it without knowing (this also translates to stolen food that is his), it almost always causes his temper to flare, and he will demand a new one; at least once, however, he has done so simply to haze somebody, in particular McGee when he was a new team member. He even considers coffee the equivalent of breakfast, as seen when he was offered a selection of food from a diner, Abby asked him to at least have something before he left, and Gibbs merely grabbed the coffee cup.
 Up until the middle of season 13, Gibbs has more or less abandoned the upstairs bedroom of his house in favor of sleeping on the couch downstairs, since he has no inclination to keep his domestic habits attractive living by himself, especially with no romantic partner most of the time to appease. This can be attributed to the fact that he has slept in the master bedroom in the company of several women who no longer are a part of his life, stirring up bad memories. The bedroom now serves as a store of his keepsakes and an extra place for those he considers special guests to sleep. This changes in the season 13 episode "Scope" when Gibbs starts sleeping in his bedroom again, slowly letting go his bad memories.
 He does not tolerate submissiveness. When someone on his team allows another person to manipulate them, Gibbs takes it personally as an affront to his work ethic. Gibbs is unapologetic by nature as well, as he considers apologizing to be a sign of weakness when it is done fearfully in light of intimidation, and suggests to his team members that they should refrain from doing so; a sincere apology given when someone is distraught or has meaningful reasons to apologize is acceptable.
 Gibbs has taken strong displeasure at being rewarded for his services in the military because he has a deep sense of regret attached to his career and prefers to be commended privately. Much of it has to do with the deaths of Shannon and Kelly. Moreover, Gibbs holds himself responsible for the estrangement with his former mother-in-law in taking her daughter and granddaughter away from her, due to his absence leaving them vulnerable and indirectly causing their murder. This left his mother-in-law in so much grief that it led to the dissolution of her own marriage. Eventually, he found peace with most of his regrets in the 200th episode of the series "Life Before His Eyes", where Gibbs learned that even if he had been present in their lives and thus prevented the sequence of events that ended in their deaths from ever coming to be, the path his life would have taken would have instead led to his own demise.
 Gibbs' trademark outfit is a suit jacket and trousers paired with a white undershirt and a polo shirt. In some episodes, he wears a dress shirt instead of a polo shirt; this change became permanent from season 13 forward. In season 15, he appears to be alternating in-between both these looks; wearing a dress shirt on some days and polo shirts on other days.  Gibbs also is noted for his hair being trimmed very tight at the sides, a reference to him being a former Marine
 When it comes to weapons Gibbs is well versed. Gibbs carries a SIG Sauer P228 and a revolver strapped to his ankle. In season 14 Gibbs switches his primary to a Colt M1911. The gun was his father's. He also carries a knife at all times. In his home Gibbs is seen hiding the pistol in his bookcase. Gibbs also keeps his basement stocked. Under his work bench he keeps a Smith and Wesson Model 66. Gibbs also keeps his Remington M40 sniper rifle in his basement.

Awards and citations
At the end of the episode "Murder 2.0", Gibbs was awarded his seventh Navy Meritorious Civilian Service Award, but as with the other six times, he did not attend the award ceremony and Tony accepts the medal on his behalf. When Gibbs shows no interest in it, Tony locks it in a box containing several similar presentation cases, all of which were awarded to Gibbs. One of these medals is revealed to have been a Silver Star, which Gibbs bestows on Corporal Damon Werth in the episode "Corporal Punishment". It is revealed in the episode "Hiatus Pt. 1" that Gibbs received the Purple Heart after being injured in Operation Desert Storm during the Gulf War and was in a coma for nineteen days as a result.

Gibbs was shown wearing the following awards and decorations in the episodes "One Shot, One Kill" and "Honor Code".
Note: The Navy Meritorious Civilian Service Medal ribbon is placed as a U.S. non-military personal decoration after U.S. military unit awards in the order of precedence.

Gibbs' Rules
In the episode "Heartland", Gibbs is revealed by flashbacks to have met his first wife, Shannon (portrayed in that episode by Aviva Baumann), while waiting at the Stillwater train platform in summer of 1976, where she tells him about her rules for life that would inspire a similar set of Gibbs' own that he now teaches to his subordinate agents at NCIS - his own series of around fifty rules that he now lives by (with the rules in the forties and above supposedly used for emergency situations).

Reception
Early reception was primarily positive. During NCIS first season on air, Ross Warneke wrote of Gibbs, "He's still wincing from three failed marriages and is a bit of a renegade within the service." He further called Mark Harmon's performance "convincing" and added that the character "has a heart of gold". Two years later, in November 2005, Noel Holston from the Sun-Sentinel said, "NCIS special agent, Jethro Gibbs, is one of those hard-shelled, soft-centered guys' guys Bellisario loves to write, a clear-thinking, decisive leader in whose crankiness his subordinates take an almost masochistic pleasure."

William Bradly of The Huffington Post wrote an opinion piece in 2011 in response to NCIS being voted America's favorite television show in which he commented, "Gibbs is a hard-ass, but a very nice hard-ass, who usually has all the answers thanks to his well-honed 'gut.' And when he doesn't, the quirky science nerds are there to help him out in their reassuringly civvy ways." In 2012, Kyle Smith from the New York Post praised the show's respect for the military and Harmon's portrayal of a Marine.

One reviewer wrote a long analysis:

Never, have I seen a show portray such an accurate description of leadership. Agent Jethro Gibbs is a very intimidating leader; to his agents, and to his suspects. No one wants to mess with Gibbs, and that is no surprise. He is incredibly strong emotionally, and a very loving person to his family. His top qualities are leadership and fearlessness. Gibbs is also very impatient, and easily angered, which don't serve him well in his relationships.

Leadership is Gibbs' best quality. On the outside, he is tough as nails, seemingly impossible to break. On the inside, he is a compassionate person, who is extremely supportive of his friends and family.

In 2011, June Thomas from Slate magazine wrote, "Team leader Gibbs (Mark Harmon) is a coffee-slurping stoic, a former Marine often exasperated by his sometimes-silly underlings." She also discussed the show and its characters' appeal to conservatives: "They're intelligent, hard-working, and devoted...Gibbs is an old-fashioned man: strong and silent, a skilled woodworker who doesn't lock his front door." Alyssa Rosenberg of the Washington Monthly also suggested that Gibbs, "a former Marine with a Bush-like faith in his 'gut', appeared as a distinctly conservative figure in the series, in contrast to "liberal stand-ins" McGee and Abby Sciuto.

In 2011, it was reported that the role had made Mark Harmon the fourth most popular actor on primetime television. Several other members of the NCIS cast were also listed in the top ten, including Pauley Perrette (Abby Sciuto), Cote de Pablo (Ziva David), David McCallum (Ducky Mallard), and Michael Weatherly (Anthony DiNozzo).

References

External links
 Mark Harmon's CBS profile

Crossover characters in television
Fictional American military snipers
Fictional characters from Pennsylvania
Television characters introduced in 2003
Fictional Gulf War veterans
Fictional gunnery sergeants
Fictional Naval Criminal Investigative Service personnel
Fictional United States invasion of Panama veterans
Fictional United States Marine Corps personnel
NCIS (TV series) characters

de:Liste der Figuren aus Navy CIS#Leroy Jethro Gibbs